Eli DuBose Hoyle (July 19, 1851 – July 27, 1921) was a brigadier general in the United States Army. He is most noted for his command of the port of embarkation at Governor's Island in New York Harbor during World War I, for which he received the Distinguished Service Medal and Soldier's Medal.

Early life
Hoyle was born in Canton, Georgia, on July 19, 1851, the son of George Summers Hoyle and Margareth Amanda (Erwin) Hoyle.

Hoyle graduated from the United States Military Academy at West Point in 1875, and was commissioned as a second lieutenant of Field Artillery. His brother George S. Hoyle and he were notable as two of the first post-American Civil War West Point students from former Confederate states.

Start of career
During Hoyle's early years in the Army his service included instructor at West Point; the military response to the Great Railroad Strike of 1877; and adjutant at West Point. During the Spanish–American War he served with 1st Division, 1st Corps in Puerto Rico, then as chief ordnance officer for 3d Division, 2d Corps in Athens, Georgia, and then as chief ordnance officer and provost marshal for the Department of Matanzas in Cuba, Feb. 2 to April 26, 1899.

Effective dates of promotions
Hoyle was promoted to first lieutenant in 1883; captain in 1898; major (United States Volunteers) in 1898; major (regular Army) in 1903; lieutenant colonel in 1907; colonel in 1911; and brigadier general in 1913. He retired in 1915, but was recalled to active duty for World War I.

Later career
His command assignments included Battery L, 1st Field Artillery Regiment (1899–1900); Recruit Depot at Fort Slocum (1908); 6th Field Artillery (1908–1911, 1911–1913); 4th Field Artillery (1911); Fort Riley (1912–1913); Central Department (1913); 2nd Field Artillery (1913); District of Luzon, Philippines (1913–1914); and Fort William McKinley (1914).

World War I
During his World War I recall to active duty he was assigned as commander of the Department of the East, with primary responsibility for the Governor's Island Port of Embarkation in New York Harbor. Hoyle retired again in 1919.

Death and burial
Hoyle died in Washington, D.C., on July 27, 1921. He was buried at Arlington National Cemetery, Section 3, Grave 4442.

Family
Hoyle was married to Fanny De Russy (1857–1925), the daughter of Brigadier General René Edward De Russy. Their son Rene Edward De Russy Hoyle (1883–1981) was a career Army officer who attained the rank of major general. The Hoyles were also the parents of four daughters, all of whom married West Point graduates: Helen Maxwell Hoyle Herr (1882–1971), the wife of John Knowles Herr; Imogene Hoyle Taulbee (1885–1982), the wife of Colonel Joseph Fulton Taulbee; Fanny DeRussy Hoyle Graham (1889–1981), the wife of Lieutenant Colonel Ephraim Foster Graham; and Margaret Hoyle Higley (1891–1988), the wife of Brigadier General Harvey D. Higley.

Legacy
Fort Hoyle, an artillery post in Maryland which operated from 1922 to 1940, was named for him.

References

External links

Eli D. Hoyle at Military Times Hall of Valor

1851 births
1921 deaths
People from Canton, Georgia
United States Army generals
United States Military Academy alumni
Burials at Arlington National Cemetery
United States Army generals of World War I
Recipients of the Soldier's Medal
Recipients of the Distinguished Service Medal (US Army)
United States Army Field Artillery Branch personnel
Military personnel from Georgia (U.S. state)
American military personnel of the Spanish–American War